Brendan Gullifer (born 1959) is an Australian writer based in Melbourne who was chief of staff to the independent Victorian senator John Madigan.

His first book, The Pocketbook of Aussie Patriotism, a compact guide to Australian history, was published by Black Inc books in January 2007. Gullifer's debut novel, Sold, a black comedy set in the Melbourne real estate industry, was published in April 2009 by Sleepers Publishing.

Gullifer produced and hosted two podcasts, The Naked Novelist, for fiction writers, and The Chill Factory, featuring new releases in jazz, ambient, new age and world music. They had upwards of 50,000 downloads. In May 2007, he began co-hosting Published or Not, a weekly program for writers on Melbourne radio station 3CR. He has also made appearances at Scotch College as part of its Literature Festival.

Gullifer has a master's degree in creative media from RMIT University and post-graduate qualifications in teaching English. 
He was given the Journalist of the Year Award in 2011 by WindTurbineSyndrome.com, being described as "An Australian.  A novelist who's not afraid to 'muck-rake' ", and compared favourably to Henry L. Mencken. Gullifer has also published material on "Stop These Things", an anti-wind website.

He left Victoria to Danger Island, NSW, after leaving the role of chief of staff with John Madigan.

References 

Australian non-fiction writers
1959 births
Living people
Writers from Melbourne